Alka Kubal (born 23 September 1963) is a Marathi film actress from Mumbai, India. She has worked in many Marathi movies and some Hindi movies. Her film Maherchi Sadi made her a household name in Maharashtra. She has worked with noted actors such as Dada Kondke, Ashok Saraf, Lakshmikant Berde and Sachin. She has also appeared in Hindi films like Chakra (1981) with Naseeruddin Shah and a devotional film Shirdi Sai Baba.

She has received several awards including the V. Shantaram Award in 2016, Rajya Sanskrutik Puraskar in 2013 and many others.

She is married to the cinematographer Sameer Athalye, and along with acting she produced some Marathi films like Aamhi Ka Tisre (2012), Agnipariksha (2010) and Suwasinichi Hee Satwapariksha (2010). She has played the role of the mother in the biopic Dr Tatyarao Lahane... Angaar Power is Within.

Filmography 
 Chakra (aka The Vicious Circle) (1981)
 Sobati (1981)
 Lek Chalali Sasarla (1984)
 Vahinichi Maya (1985)... Madhavi
 Tujhya Vachun Karamena (1986)
 Rickshawali (1989)
 Madhu Chandrachi Ratra (1989)
 Balache Baap Brahmachari (1989)
 Shubha Bol Narya (1990)
 Lapwa Chhapwi (1990)
 Yeda Ki Khula (1991)
 Jasa Baap Tashya Poore (1991)... Pooja M. Thorat/Pooja T. Sahukar
 Maherchi Sadi (1991)
 Naya Zaher (1991)
 Zakhmi Kunku (1995) 
 Saasuchi Maaya (1997)... Gayetri Naik
 Nirmala Machindra Kamble (1999)... Nirmala D. Gaekwad/Nirmala M. Kamble
 Shirdi Sai Baba (2001)
 Devki (2001)
 Owalini (2002)
 Aai Tuza Ashirwad (2004)
 Oti Krishnamaichi (2004)
 Naatigothi (2006) (as Alka Kubal-Athlaye)... Kusum V. Rao
 De Taali (2008)
 Astharoopa Jai Vaibhavlakshmi Maata (2008) (TV)... Sheela
 Oti Hi Kha
 Agniparikshya (2010) 
 He Vaat Jivanachi (2012) 
 Amhi Ka Tisre (2012) 
 Sur Rahu De (2013) 
 Sutradhar (2013) 
 Shrimant Damodhar Pant (2013)
 Majhi Shala (2013) 
 Sant Several (2013) 
 Marg Maza Aekala (2014) 
 Olkh My Identity (2015) 
 Te Don Divas (2015) 
 Anjaan Parindey (2015) 
 Well Done BhalyaBhalya (2016) 
 Chiranjeev (2016)
 Ghar Hote Menachem (2018) 
 Dr. Tatyaa Lahane (2018) 
 Wedding Cha Shinema (2019)
 Dhurala (2020)

References

External links 
 

Actresses from Mumbai
Living people
Actresses in Marathi cinema
20th-century Indian actresses
21st-century Indian actresses
Indian film actresses
1965 births